Hubert Wood (14 May 1893 – 23 February 1957) was a South African cricketer. He played in six first-class matches for Border from 1920/21 to 1924/25.

See also
 List of Border representative cricketers

References

External links
 

1893 births
1957 deaths
South African cricketers
Border cricketers
People from Makhanda, Eastern Cape
Cricketers from the Eastern Cape